Herbert Lawford defeated Ernest Renshaw 6–2, 6–3, 2–6, 4–6, 6–4 in the all comers' final to win the gentlemen's singles tennis title at the 1887 Wimbledon Championships. The reigning champion William Renshaw was unable to defend his title due to a tennis elbow.

Draw

All Comers'

References

External links

Gentlemen's Singles
Wimbledon Championship by year – Men's singles